The Western Rocks, also known as Black Rocks, are a pair of islets located close to the south-western coast of Tasmania, Australia. The steep, wave-washed  islets are part of the Maatsuyker Islands Group, and comprises part of the Southwest National Park and the Tasmanian Wilderness World Heritage Site.

Fauna
The only recorded breeding seabird species is the fairy prion with up to 20 pairs in a small patch of succulent vegetation.

See also

 South East Cape
 South West Cape
 List of islands of Tasmania

References

Islands of South West Tasmania
Protected areas of Tasmania
South West coast of Tasmania